Gradski Stadion may refer to:

Bosnia and Herzegovina
 Gradski stadion Banja Luka
 Gradski stadion (Bijeljina)
 Gradski stadion (Bileća), the stadium of FK Hercegovac
 Gradski stadion (Gradiška)
 Gradski stadion (Konjic), the stadium of FK Igman Konjic
 Gradski Stadion (Krupa na Vrbasu)
 Gradski stadion (Laktaši)
 Gradski stadion (Orašje)
 Gradski stadion (Prijedor)
 Gradski Stadion (Vitez)
 Gradski stadion (Žepče)
 Gradski stadion (Zvornik), the stadium of FK Drina Zvornik
 Gradski stadion Luke (Mrkonjić Grad)
 Gradski stadion Tušanj, Tuzla, Bosnia and Herzegovina

Bulgaria
 Gradski stadion (Lovech), Lovech, Bulgaria
 Gradski stadion (Ruse), Ruse, Bulgaria

Croatia
 Gradski stadion (Koprivnica)
 Gradski stadion (Kutina)
 Gradski stadion (Sinj)
 Gradski stadion (Sisak)
 Gradski stadion (Vrbovec), the stadium of NK Vrbovec
 Stadion Varteks, sometimes referred to as Gradski stadion (Varaždin) during international football matches

Montenegro
 Gradski stadion (Berane)
 Gradski stadion (Bijelo Polje)
 Gradski stadion (Mojkovac)
 Gradski stadion (Nikšić)
 Gradski stadion (Pljevlja)

North Macedonia
 Gradski stadion Gostivar
 Gradski Stadion Kavadarci
 Gradski stadion Kičevo
 Gradski stadion Kratovo
 Gradski Stadion Plaža
 Gradski stadion Skopje
 Gradski stadion Štip
 Gradski stadion Tetovo
 Gradski Stadium Kumanovo

Serbia
 Gradski stadion (Kraljevo), the stadium of FK Sloga Kraljevo
 Gradski Stadion Subotica
 Gradski stadion Novi Pazar

See also 
 City Stadium (disambiguation)